Ganesh Shankar Bajpai is an Indian politician who was the member of Chhattisgarh Legislative Assembly from Baloda Bazar Assembly constituency ( no 47)  then Raipur district, ( now Baloda Bazar district ), during 2003–2008.

References

Living people
People from Baloda Bazar
Year of birth missing (living people)
Place of birth missing (living people)